A station house officer (SHO) is the officer in charge of a police station  in India and Pakistan. The Station House Officer (SHO) is a police officer of such rank as may be fixed by the government who is entrusted with the overall supervision of the functions of each police station and that officer shall be the officer in charge of the police station. The SHO holds the rank of inspector or sub-inspector. A station house officer is not a rank, but rather a post or designation. In India, the law permits a station house officer to conduct the investigation of crimes.  

As of 1 January 2022, there are a total of 16,955 sanctioned police stations in India.

Officer-in-charge (OC)
In some states in India, the SHO is also called the Officer-in-charge (OC), mostly in rural areas where a police station is headed by a Sub-inspector of police.

Inspector-in-charge (IC)
In West Bengal, mostly in urban or semi-urban areas, where a police station is headed by an inspector, is called the Inspector-in-charge (IC)

Functions
The Station House Officer:
 shall maintain law and order within the respective jurisdiction of each police station
 is responsible for the prevention and detection of crimes within the jurisdiction of the police station
 shall ensure timely completion of investigation and submission of Final Report before the Hon’ble Court
 is responsible for the proper functioning and supervision of subordinate police officers of the police station

References

Law enforcement in Pakistan
Law enforcement in India